Annie's or Annies may refer to:

 Annie's Homegrown, a maker of organic foods (or Annie's Naturals, a condiments brand within the company)
 Annie Award for film animation
 Annie's Bay, Bermuda

See also
 Annys (disambiguation)